Charlie Sydney Howard (born 26 November 1989 in London) is an English footballer.

He made his senior Gillingham debut in a 4–0 home win in the Football League Trophy southern section quarter final against Dagenham & Redbridge on 3 November 2007. Howard made his full Football League debut at Port Vale on Easter Monday 2008.

In the 2008–09 season, he had loan spells at Dulwich Hamlet and Thurrock (twice). He parted company with Gillingham at the end of the season.

References

External links
Charlie Howard player profile at gillinghamfootballclub.com

1989 births
Living people
English footballers
Footballers from the London Borough of Southwark
English Football League players
Gillingham F.C. players
Dulwich Hamlet F.C. players
Thurrock F.C. players
Association football midfielders